Legalist, Inc. is an investment firm that specializes in alternative assets in the private credit industry. Today the firm manages approximately $750 million across three separate strategies: litigation finance, bankruptcy (debtor-in-possession or DIP) financing, and government receivables lending. The firm’s clients include institutional investors such as endowments, foundations, hospitals, insurance companies, and family offices.

History
The company was founded in 2016 by Harvard University undergraduates, Eva Shang and Christian Haigh, and was part of that year's Summer Y Combinator Demo Day.  

In November 2017, Forbes Magazine included Legalist's founders in its "30 Under 30" Law & Policy list and reported that Legalist had raised $10.25 million over the summer. 

In September 2019, The Wall Street Journal reported that Legalist had raised and closed its second fund of $100 million. 

In April 2020, AngelList named Legalist among the 52 best startups to watch out for.

In March 2021, Reuters reported that Legalist had raised $50 million for its first bankruptcy fund.

By August 2022, Legalist managed approximately $750 million across three distinct private credit strategies: litigation finance, bankruptcy financing, and government receivables lending.

References

2016 establishments in California
American companies established in 2016
Financial services companies established in 2016
Companies based in San Francisco
Financial services companies based in California
Privately held companies based in California
Privately held companies of the United States
Y Combinator companies